Benavides Independent School District is a public school district based in Benavides, Texas (USA).  The district is situated in the southwestern corner of Duval County. In addition to Benavides, the unincorporated communities of Concepcion and Realitos are also part of the district.

Seventh through twelfth grade students living in the Ramirez Common School District attend Benavides schools.

Finances
As of the 2010–2011 school year, the appraised valuation of property in the district was $285,808,000. The maintenance tax rate was $0.104 and the bond tax rate was $0.021 per $100 of appraised valuation.

Academic achievement
In 2011, the school district was rated "academically acceptable" by the Texas Education Agency.

Schools
In the 2011–2012 school year, the district had two open schools.
Benavides Secondary School (Grades 7-12)
Benavides Elementary School (Grades PK-6)

See also

List of school districts in Texas

References

External links

School districts in Duval County, Texas